"The Riddler" is a single by Method Man from the Batman Forever soundtrack based on the character of the same name. It was released on October 24, 1995 for Atlantic Records and produced by fellow Wu-Tang Clan member, RZA. The single found decent success,  making it to four different Billboard charts, including #56 on the magazine's main chart, the Billboard Hot 100.

A promotional music video directed by Diane Martel was released with Method Man performing the song intercut with scenes from the film featuring The Riddler.

Track listing

A-side
"The Riddler" (Album Version) 
"The Riddler" (Hide-Out Remix)

B-side
"The Riddler" (Album Instrumental) 
"The Riddler" (Hide-Out Remix Instrumental)

Charts

References

1994 songs
1995 singles
Batman music
Method Man songs
Song recordings produced by RZA
Songs written by Method Man
Atlantic Records singles
Batman (1989 film series)